The 1945 Smethwick by-election was a by-election held on 1 October 1945 for the British House of Commons constituency of Smethwick in Staffordshire (now in the West Midlands county).

The by-election was caused by the death of the town's newly elected Labour Party Member of Parliament (MP), 63-year-old Alfred Dobbs, who was killed in a car accident on 27 July 1945, only one day after his election at the 1945 general election Apart from some MPs who were elected posthumously, Dobbs remains the United Kingdom's shortest-serving MP.

There were only two candidates in the by-election, Labour and Conservative; the Liberal Party had not fielded a candidate in Smethwick since the 1929 general election.

The result was a victory for the Labour candidate Patrick Gordon Walker, who held the seat comfortably with a slightly increased majority on a modestly reduced turnout. Gordon Walker was an MP for nearly 30 years, serving twice as a Cabinet minister.

Votes

References

See also 
 List of United Kingdom by-elections
 Smethwick constituency
 1926 Smethwick by-election

1945 in England
1945 elections in the United Kingdom
By-elections to the Parliament of the United Kingdom in West Midlands (county) constituencies
Smethwick
By-elections to the Parliament of the United Kingdom in Staffordshire constituencies
20th century in Staffordshire